Carex obtusata (also known as obtuse sedge) is a species of sedge in the massive genus Carex.

It is native to Canada.

References

obtusata
Plants described in 1793